Holden, officially GM Holden Ltd was the Australian subsidiary of General Motors (GM), the world’s second largest automaker. Since its automotive beginnings, Holden has offered a range of locally manufactured vehicles, either of their own or foreign design. Imported vehicles from within GM have supplemented these Australian-made cars, providing Holden with a full range of models. In the past, third party automakers have fulfilled this responsibility.

Holden vehicles by nameplate 

Since Holden’s inception as an autonomous automaker (within GM), the vast majority of their vehicles have been designated a nameplate, for example, the Holden Kingswood and Holden Commodore, with "Kingswood" and "Commodore" representative of this. The exceptions to this trend are the 48-215 series "Holden sedan" (1948–1953), the Holden Standard-based utility and panel van body styles (1951–1968), and the Holden Belmont-based utilities and panel vans from 1974 through to 1984. For this reason, these cars are excluded from this list, and are instead covered in the list of Holden vehicles by series.

Holden vehicles by series 

Holden vehicles, in addition to nameplate, are designated by a series code. For example, the 1971–1974 Holden Kingswood has been assigned the series code "HQ", and the 2002–2004 Holden Commodore, "VY". Often these series codes are not arbitrary. In the case of the VY above, the "V" stands for the GM V platform that underpins it. The letter "Y" is not however significant; it is simply a logical successor to the previous "VX" Commodore model. Meaning can be found in other codes. The TX Gemini and MB Barina for example, where the "T" and the "M" denote the GM T and M platforms that underpin each vehicle, respectively. While the majority of Holden cars follow this double-letter format (not necessarily based on platform), anomalies exist. The "V2" code applies to the 2001–2004 Holden Monaro, with "V" indicating the V platform architecture and the "2" possibly referring to its two-door body style. Similarly, the 1998–2001 Holden Suburban designated "K8". The three-letter codes assigned to the WFR series Holden Shuttle and UBS Jackaroo are the remaining incongruous designations. These codes are simply those carried over from the original Isuzu models that the Shuttle and Jackaroo derive from.

The VY series of Holdens were not restricted to the Commodore; VY Berlina and Calais cars were also marketed. All three are essentially identical, except in terms of level of equipment and luxury and have therefore been separated using different nameplates. Holden’s record of separating fundamentally identical cars by nameplate to occupy different niches applies mainly to their locally made "large" cars, for example, the Holden Belmont/Kingswood/Premier, Commodore/Berlina/Calais and Statesman/Caprice. Derivative versions with unique body styles, like the Monaro coupe often share the series code with their donor model. Outside of "large" cars, the only other Holdens to have operated in a similar manner are the UBS Jackaroo/Monterey twins and the LX and UC Sunbird/Torana. Generally, only the "large" Holdens are referred to by series code, thus this list is confined to listing only these models. List of Holden vehicles by nameplate covers these excluded cars, with the "large" Holden models occupying both lists.

Notes

External links 
 

Holden